Mesena is an unincorporated community in Warren County, Georgia, United States. Mesena has a post office with ZIP code 30819.

Mesena is said to have been named by J. F. (or J. H.) Hamilton, who coined it from the initial letters of the first names of his six daughters (Mary, Evelyn, Sara, Emily, Nancy, and Ann).

References

Unincorporated communities in Warren County, Georgia
Unincorporated communities in Georgia (U.S. state)